Simon James Haughton (born 10 November 1975) is an English former professional rugby league and rugby union footballer who played as a  forward in the 1990s and 2000s. He played representative level rugby league for Great Britain and England, and at club level for the Wigan Warriors (Heritage № 887) and Oldham RLFC (Heritage № 1164), and club level rugby union for Orrell R.U.F.C.

Playing career
Haughton grew up playing for amateur club Dudley Hill, signing a professional contract with Wigan on his 17th birthday.

Haughton was an England international and played at the 1995 Rugby League World Cup.

In the 1997 post-season Haughton was selected to play for Great Britain in the Super League Test series against Australia, scoring two tries in the third and deciding match.

He played for Wigan Warriors from the interchange bench in their 1998 Super League Grand Final victory over Leeds Rhinos.

In July 2002, Haughton switched codes to sign for rugby union side Orrell. He returned to rugby league in December 2004, signing for Oldham.

Regal Trophy Final appearances
Simon Houghton played  in Wigan's 25-16 victory over St. Helens in the 1995–96 Regal Trophy Final during the 1994–95 season at Alfred McAlpine Stadium, Huddersfield on Saturday 13 January 1996.

References

External links
(archived by web.archive.org) World Cup 1995 details

1975 births
Living people
England national rugby league team players
English rugby league players
English rugby union players
Great Britain national rugby league team players
Oldham R.L.F.C. players
Orrell R.U.F.C. players
People educated at Bingley Grammar School
Rugby league players from Bingley
Rugby union players from Bingley
Rugby league second-rows
Wigan Warriors players